is a train station in Nishikan-ku, Niigata, Niigata Prefecture, Japan, operated by East Japan Railway Company (JR East).

Lines
Echigo-Sone Station is served by the Echigo Line, and is 62.4 kilometers from the starting point of the line at Kashiwazaki Station.

Layout

The station consists of two ground-level opposed side platforms connected by a footbridge, serving two tracks.

The station has a "Midori no Madoguchi" staffed ticket office. Suica farecard can be used at this station.

Platforms

History 
It was renamed to its present name on 20 April 1913. With the privatization of Japanese National Railways (JNR) on 1 April 1987, the station came under the control of JR East.

Passenger statistics
In fiscal 2017, the station was used by an average of 910 passengers daily (boarding passengers only).

Surrounding area
Nishikawa Post Office
 Sone Elementary School
Nishikawa Middle School

See also
 List of railway stations in Japan

References

External links
 JR East station information 

Railway stations in Niigata (city)
Railway stations in Japan opened in 1912
Stations of East Japan Railway Company
Echigo Line